Cristian Franco (born October 11, 1985 in Montevideo, Uruguay) is a Uruguayan Association football Defender currently playing for Los Andes of the Primera B Metropolitana in Argentina.

Teams
  Cerro 2009
  Bella Vista 2010-2011
  Los Andes 2011–present

External links
 
 

1985 births
Living people
Uruguayan footballers
Uruguayan expatriate footballers
C.A. Bella Vista players
C.A. Cerro players
Club Atlético Los Andes footballers
Expatriate footballers in Argentina
Association football defenders